Haploidoceros is an extinct genus of deer that lived in Europe during the Pleistocene. It contains a single species, Haploidoceros mediterraneus. Fossils have been found mainly in France, as well as the Iberian peninsula.

Taxonomy
Haploidoceros was described in 2008. Its remains were originally assigned to the genus Euctenoceros (now usually synonymous with Eucladoceros),  though examination of the cranial proportions and morphology show it is distinct.

Based on antler morphology, its closest living relative is the barasingha of South Asia. The genus Rucervus had a much wider distribution in prehistoric times, extending into Europe.

Description
Its hind limbs were especially well-developed, indicating it was a good jumper who possibly moved in a bounding gait. Its unique antlers were split into two beams adorned with a single tip at the end. The posterior beam was sickle-shaped, while the front beam was comparatively shorter and straighter. It possessed big cheek teeth which is indicative of a grazing diet, yet had pre-maxillary bones which were narrow and sharp suggesting it also browsed.

Paleoecology
Haploidoceros favored temperate climates. It probably lived in forests to semi-open woodland, and based on its morphology it had mixed feeding traits, with clear tendency toward leaf browsing. It lived alongside a variety of other ungulates, such as equids, rhinoceroses, wild boar, aurochs and the straight-tusked elephant.

Sites containing fossils of Haploidoceros mediterraneus are notable in their absence of fallow deer remains, despite the species being common in other nearby sites in the time period. It is believed that the niches of these deer were too similar for both to occupy the same area. Both species avoided competition by choosing different habitats; Haploidoceros favoring woodland and the fallow deer staying in more open areas.

Extinction
The oldest Haploidoceros remains are from the Middle Pleistocene, dated to approximately 440-390 ka. The youngest remains are dated to 90 ka. Given its dependency on temperate climate, Haploidoceros probably went extinct during the Last Glacial Period, when temperatures significantly cooled and its favored habitats shrunk.

References

Cervinae
Prehistoric deer
Pleistocene even-toed ungulates
Prehistoric mammals of Europe
Pleistocene mammals of Europe
Pleistocene extinctions
Prehistoric monotypic mammal genera